The Cooper T77 is a 1.5-litre Formula One car entered in the 1965 Formula One World Championship by the Cooper Car Company.

Development
1965 saw Cooper in a state of flux. Cooper's founder Charlie Cooper had died in 1964 and his son John sold the company in April 1965. Designer Owen Maddock had left. The 1.5 litre formula was in its final year and the focus was on the new 3-litre formula. No real development was carried out and so the T77 was not much changed from the previous year's T73.

Racing history
 
The T77 made its World Championship debut at the 1965 Monaco Grand Prix, where McLaren finished fifth and Rindt failed to qualify. The rest of the season proved to be another disappointment for the team, their best result being McLaren's third place in Belgium, and Rindt's fourth place in Germany. McLaren finished ninth in the World Championship with 10 points and Rindt finished thirteenth with 4 points. In the Constructors' Championship, Cooper  finished fifth.

This was McLaren's final year with Cooper. He left to form his own team. Jochen Rindt remained, driving the new T81, initially teamed with Richie Ginther, and then by John Surtees following his acrimonious departure from Ferrari. 

Rindt's car was sold on and fitted with an ATS 2.7 litre V8 engine. Jo Bonnier practiced it at the 1966 French Grand Prix but found it too slow. Silvio Moser then drove it in the British Grand Prix. Starting twentieth, he did not finish the race because of an oil pressure problem.

Formula One World Championship results
(key) (results in bold indicate pole position; results in italics indicate fastest lap)

Formula One Non-Championship results
(key) (results in bold indicate pole position; results in italics indicate fastest lap)

References

Cooper Formula One cars
1960s cars
Cars of England